The Xiaolou Mosque is a mosque in Erqi District, Zhengzhou, Henan, China.

History
The mosque was constructed in the 1920s. The mosque was rebuilt in 1979 and was renovated in 1984.

Architecture
The mosque is a five-story building and covers an area of 4,000 m2. It features a school that teaches Arabic.

Transportation
The mosque is accessible within walking distance north of Zhengzhou railway station.

See also
 Islam in China
 List of mosques in China

References

Buildings and structures in Zhengzhou
Mosques in China
Religion in Zhengzhou